Les 11 commandements (or The 11 Commandments in English speaking countries) is a French comedy film, made in 2004, featuring Michaël Youn. It is comparable to the American TV series Jackass.  It was theatrically released in France in February 2004 and led the French box office in its first week of release.

Plot
Variety'''s review of the film describes its plot as "Six lads. . . embark on idiotic physical challenges at the behest of the God of Jokes (Dieudonné), to restore mirth to a morose planet." The crew of stuntmen and pranksters have to perform 11 commandments (which are like tasks or tests). These tasks include:
 Being a "wall", while Djibril Cissé strikes footballs into them
 Seeing who can obtain the highest penalty by annoying the local law enforcement officers (this is an ongoing contest between casts throughout the film, inserts are shown between commandments)
 Converting a villa into a swimming pool by blocking all the exits and flooding it
 Rollerskating or inline skating after taking sleeping pills
 Competing against each other on a racing track dressed as penises
 Devastating a supermarket after starting using ketchup jets on bystanders and on each other
 Playing beach volleyball while under the influence of Viagra
 Eating the second hottest chili in the world
 Singing a country and western song in the middle of library in Paris
 Trying to serve food in a restaurant after voluntarily altering their balance
 Ploughing a penis into a corn field
 Driving around a town dressed as Adolf Hitler
 Recreating a medieval duel while riding airplane staircases
 Delivering pizza with a surprise - the surprise being an instant party of around 50 people
 Riding completely nude mocking a romantic video clip
 Performing ballet in zero gravity
 Ruining a van by eating junk food and proceeding to clean it up by filling it with foam
 Playing the bagpipes while riding an ostrich
 Sneaking farm animals into an upper-class hotel
 Having a picnic on a tennis court while Amélie Mauresmo is serving tennis balls at them
 Performing a particular song against the sporting event host and being booed by the audience
 Riding an astronaut training centrifuge while being inebriated
 Performing a "My Sharona" adaption while blocking a street
 Playing escalating practical pranks on each other during credits (as outtakes)

Cast
 Michaël Youn : Mike
 Vincent Desagnat : Vincent
  : Ben
 William Geslin : Willy
  : Tefa
 Dieudonné M'bala M'bala : The God of Jokes
 Gad Elmaleh : Gad
 Jurij Prette : Yuri
 Patrick Timsit : Toto / Fifou
 Djibril Cissé : Himself
 Amélie Mauresmo : Herself
 Gad Elmaleh : Himself
  : A policewoman

See also
 CKY The Dudesons Dirty Sanchez Too Stupid to Die Tokyo Shock Boys''

References

External links
 

2004 films
French comedy films
2000s French-language films
Censored films
Films directed by François Desagnat
Stunts
2000s French films